= Southampton, Richmond, Virginia =

Unincorporated community in Virginia, US

Coordinates: 37°33′20″N 77°32′57″W

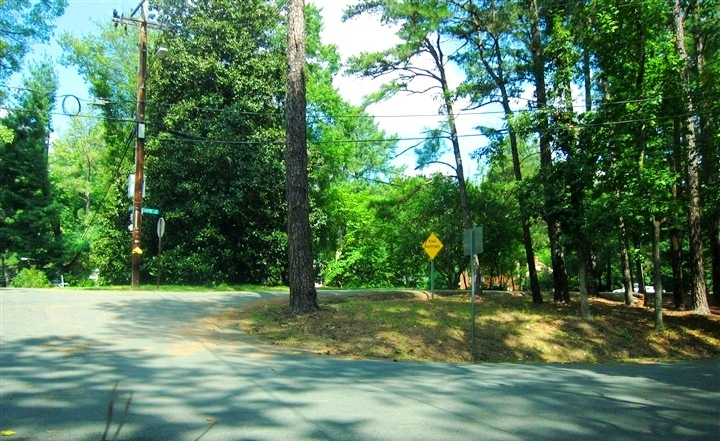
Southampton, Richmond, Virginia

Southampton is an unincorporated community in the City of Richmond, in the U.S. state of Virginia.
